Leonardo Auernheimer (August 27, 1936 – 2010) was an economist, professor, and international monetary consultant. (Nicknamed "pepe"). 

Auernheimer was born in Argentina to Jose Ignacio Auernheimer and Maria Elena Savanti de Auernheimer. He graduated from the University of Buenos Aires and received his Ph.D. in economics from the University of Chicago in 1973. Prior to that, he was a visiting professor at the Universidade Federal de Viçosa, Brazil, and upon graduation he came to the economics department at Texas A&M University, where he was a professor of economics until his death in 2010. He was the department head from 2002 to 2006.

Research
His research was in the area of monetary economics and open economy macroeconomics, particularly dynamic inconsistency and the fiscal theory of the price level, and has been published in the premier economic journals, including Journal of Political Economy, Econometrica, the American Economic Review, and the Journal of Monetary Economics, among others. He was an associate editor of the Journal of Applied Economics and the Journal of Development Economics. He was a frequent consultant to the World Bank in the evaluation of macroeconomic programs in many Latin American countries, as well as in Mongolia, the Republic of Georgia and Lebanon.

Consulting
While at Texas A&M he visited several times both the World Bank and the International Monetary Fund as a visiting scholar, and was a visiting professor at ITAM, in Mexico City, the Université du centre d'études macroeconomiques d'Argentine (see External links below), in Buenos Aires, and the University of Göttingen in Germany. He was a member of the editorial board of the Journal of Applied Economics. He consulted on macroeconomics policies for international organizations in several countries throughout Latin America and the Middle and Far East. He directed and served on dozens of dissertation committees from students from around the world.

Books

Essentials of Money and Banking, with Robert Ekelund, Jr., John Wiley and Sons Ltd., 1981.

Select academic articles
"Shock versus Gradualism in Models of Rational Expectations; The Case of Trade Liberalization," Journal of Development Economics, 1997.
"On the Treatment of Anticipated Shocks in Models of Optimal Control with Rational Expectations: An Economic Interpretation," American Economic Review, 1990.
"On the Outcome of Inconsistent Programs under Exchange Rate and Monetary Rules," Journal of Monetary Economics, 1987.
"The Revenue-maximizing Inflation Rate and the Treatment of the Transition to Equilibrium," Journal of Money, Credit and Banking, 1983.
"Market Organization and the Durability of Durable Goods," Econometrica, 1977.
"The Honest Government's Guide to the Revenue From the Creation of Money," Journal of Political Economy, 1974.

References

External links 
 Obituary
 Guillermo Calvo on Pepe Auernheimer
 Texas A&M Homepage
 Leonardo Auernheimer at WebMii
 Leonardo Auernheimer at UCEMA
 Université du centre d'études macroeconomiques d'Argentine (from French Wikipedia)

Argentine economists
1936 births
2010 deaths
University of Buenos Aires alumni
University of Chicago alumni
Argentine expatriates in the United States